Ane Iriarte Lasa (born 4 April 1995) is a Spanish racing cyclist, who last rode for UCI Women's Team . She rode in the women's scratch event at the 2018 UCI Track Cycling World Championships.

References

External links

1995 births
Living people
Spanish female cyclists
People from Tolosaldea
Sportspeople from Gipuzkoa
Cyclists from the Basque Country (autonomous community)